Calochortus nuttallii, also known as the sego lily, is a bulbous perennial plant that is endemic to the Western United States. It is the state flower of Utah.

Distribution and habitat
The plant is native to a number of western states, being found throughout Utah and Wyoming, large parts of eastern Nevada, and parts of Idaho, Montana, North Dakota, South Dakota, Nebraska, Colorado, Arizona, and New Mexico. It grows in dry, brushy or grassy slopes and desert high country.

Description

Calochortus nuttallii are around 15–45 cm (6–18 inches) in height and have linear leaves.

Plants have 1 to 4 flowers, each with 3 white petals (and 3 sepals) which are tinged with lilac (occasionally magenta) and have a purplish band radiating from the yellow base. A yellow petaled form with deep purple bands is known from Petrified Forest National Park. The yellow petaled form was also observed in a "super bloom" near the Orange Cliffs District of Glen Canyon National Recreation Area, on the north side of the Colorado River near Hite, Utah in May 2019. The plant blooms in early summer, with flowers that can be up to 3 inches across.

Taxonomy
Calochortus nuttallii is a species within the genus Calochortus, in a sub-group generally referred to as Mariposa Lilies. The specific epithet nuttallii, named for the English botanist and zoologist, Thomas Nuttall, was ascribed to the species by the American botanists John Torrey and Asa Gray when it was officially described in 1857.

Former varieties
A number of former varieties of Calochortus nuttallii have been reclassified as distinct species:
Calochortus nuttallii var. aureus  (S.Watson) Ownbey  is currently Calochortus aureus  S.Watson   
Calochortus nuttallii var. australis  Munz  is currently Calochortus invenustus  Greene    
Calochortus nuttallii var. bruneaunis  (A.Nelson & J.F.Macbr.) Ownbey   is currently Calochortus bruneaunsis A.Nelson & J.F.Macbr.    
Calochortus nuttallii var. leichtlinii  (Hook.f.) Smiley  is currently Calochortus leichtlinii  Hook.f.    
Calochortus nuttallii var. panamintensis  Ownbey   is currently Calochortus panamintensis  (Ownbey) Reveal   
Calochortus nuttallii var. subalpinus  M.E.Jones  is currently Calochortus leichtlinii  Hook.f.

Uses

Culinary
Native Americans had culinary uses for the bulbs, seeds, and flowers of the plant. Bulbs were roasted, boiled, or made into a porridge by the Hopi, Havasupai, Navajo, Southern Paiute, Gosiute, and Ute peoples. The Hopi used the yellow flower ceremonially.

The Shoshone taught the Mormon pioneer immigrants to use the bulb for badly needed food. This resulted in the sego lily being formally designated as the Utah State Flower in 1911. Sego is derived from the Shoshone word seego. The sego lily was commemorated by the Sego Lily Dam, a flood-prevention infrastructure project in the shape of a giant sego lily, built in Sugar House Park in Salt Lake City in 2017.

Cultivation
Calochortus nuttallii is cultivated as an ornamental plant for its attractive tulip-shaped flowers and to attract/support native pollinator species.  It prefers a deep, sandy soil with good drainage, and is cold-hardy. Plants can be propagated from newly formed bulblets which take two years to flower.

References

External links
 
 United States Department of Agriculture Plants Profile for Calochortus nuttallii (sego lily)
 Lady Bird Johnson Wildflower Center, University of Texas, NPIN−Native Plant Information Network: Calochortus nuttallii

nuttallii
Taxa named by Thomas Nuttall
Endemic flora of the United States
Flora of the Western United States
Plants used in Native American cuisine
Taxa named by Asa Gray
Taxa named by John Torrey
Cuisine of the Western United States
Symbols of Utah
Garden plants of North America
Flora without expected TNC conservation status